Erithyma is a moth genus of the family Depressariidae.

Species
 Erithyma cyanoplecta Meyrick, 1914
 Erithyma trabeella (Felder & Rogenhofer, 1875)

References

Depressariinae